Ning Chunhong (born January 21, 1968) is a Chinese chess player holding the title of Woman Grandmaster (WGM). She was in the Top 50 Women rating list from October 2001 to 2002.

In 1992 she won the women's section of the World University Chess Championship in Antwerp, Belgium.
She was awarded the title of FIDE Arbiter in 2008.

Ning plays for Tianjin chess club in the China Chess League (CCL).

See also
 Chess in China

References

External links
 
 
 

1968 births
Living people
Chinese female chess players
Chess woman grandmasters
Chess arbiters
Place of birth missing (living people)